The 2002 Arkansas Razorbacks football team represented the University of Arkansas in the 2002 NCAA Division I-A football season. The Razorbacks played five home games at Donald W. Reynolds Razorback Stadium in Fayetteville, Arkansas and three home games at War Memorial Stadium in Little Rock, Arkansas. The Razorbacks reached the 2002 SEC Championship Game and the 2002 Music City Bowl in Houston Nutt's fifth season as head coach.

Schedule

Source: 2002 Arkansas Razorbacks Football Schedule/Results

Game summaries

Boise State

Arkansas beat Boise State for their first win of 2002. An impressive day on the ground, 217 yards, coupled with seven Boise State turnovers, helped secure the Razorback victory. A blocked punt, a passing TD and then a rushing TD put the Razorbacks off to a 21–0 advantage. After two field goals and a TD strike to Decori Birmingham, the Hogs were out to a 34–0 lead, but the Broncos got on the board twice to make it 34–14. A fake field goal gave the Hogs a first down before Jones hooked up with Richard Smith on an 18-yard touchdown pass that closed the scoring at 41–14.

South Florida

Thirty five first half points and 547 yards of total offense set the Razorbacks well on their way to their second win of the season, at the expense of the South Florida Bulls. Only a field goal with a minute left in the game kept the Razorbacks from having a shutout, which would have been their first in two years. Back-up quarterback Tarvaris Jackson led a 94-yard scoring drive of his own, after three scoring drives by Matt Jones. Jackson would eventually transfer from Arkansas to Alabama A&M after Matt Jones became the apparent starting quarterback. South Florida had eight consecutive wins, the second-longest win streak in the nation, coming into this contest.

Alabama

Both Santonio Beard and Shaud Williams went over 100 yards for Alabama as the Tide beat Arkansas 30–12 at home. The Razorbacks never were within striking distance, as the Tide jumped out to a 14–0 lead, the first touchdown being an 80-yard scamper by Williams on the first play from scrimmage. A Crimson Tide field goal and Matt Jones TD run pushed the score to 17–7, but the Razorbacks could not penetrate the end zone again, as the two teams swapped field goals. A fourth quarter 50-yard touchdown pass from Brodie Croyle finished the Hogs, who tacked on an intentional safety to make the final 30–12.

Jones struggled throwing the ball, going just 7-of-18 for 111 yards with two interceptions. The loss was only the fourth home loss under Houston Nutt.

Tennessee

A six-overtime shootout was the result of the meeting between the Volunteers and the Razorbacks at Neyland Stadium in 2002. The battle-tested Razorbacks had come out victorious from a seven-overtime affair against Ole Miss the year previous. This was the longest game in NCAA Division I-A (now FBS) history. Arkansas' success in (especially multiple) overtime situations provoked Coach Houston Nutt into being quoted as saying at the beginning of the first overtime: "This is our game. We're ready." This overtime loss was the first for Arkansas in their football history.

The game began relatively low-scoring, with the Volunteers holding a 17–3 lead for the majority of the game. Tennessee leading rusher Cedric Houston missed the game with a torn ligament in his left thumb. Arkansas had injury problems of its own, and became one-dimensional with Cedric Cobbs, the Hogs' starting running back, missing much of the second half with a turf toe injury. The Razorbacks got the ball with ten minutes left in the fourth quarter and scored two touchdowns in a span of 4½ minutes. The tying touchdown was a 92-yard touchdown pass to Richard Smith from Matt Jones. Said Jones of that play after the game, "The coaches have told us never to quit, and we were down seven at our own 8, I kept thinking about that." This was at the time the longest offensive play in the history of Arkansas football, since surpassed by Broderick Green's 99-yard rush against Eastern Michigan in 2009. 

Both teams swapped field goals for the first two periods. The third was scoreless, despite an opportunity for Arkansas to shut the door with a field goal attempt. Arkansas then scored on a Matt Jones run, but failed the two-point conversion, which is required versus an extra point in the third overtime or later. The Volunteers answered the call on their first play, a 25-yard touchdown pass to wide receiver Tony Brown, but the Volunteers also failed the two, sending the game into a fifth extra period.

Tennessee's Jabari Davis then ran into the end zone, but fumbled the ball as he crossed the plane of the goal line, but teammate and backfield mate Troy Fleming fell on the ball giving Rocky Top a six-point lead. Quarterback Casey Clausen was then sacked on the two point try. De'Arrius Howard ran in for the Hogs, but an interception by Tennessee's Julian Battle kept the game continuing to a sixth overtime.
David Carlton kicked a 47-yard field goal for Arkansas in the sixth overtime, but future NFL All-Pro tight end Jason Witten caught a touchdown pass from Casey Clausen, ending the game in dramatic fashion, 41–38.

Auburn

Arkansas came out strong after their six overtime game with Tennessee. The Hogs Fred Talley rushed for 241 yards, 80 of those in one play, in a 38–17 upset of the Tigers at Auburn. 241 yards remains to this day the most given up by an Auburn defense to a single rusher. Talley was a pleasant surprise fill-in for injured starter Cedric Cobbs. Talley lead the Hogs in a 426-yard rushing effort as a team. Talley had only 123 yards in the first four games of the year. Fullback Mark Pierce also had a 44-yard run on a fourth-and-one, with Matt Jones adding a 70-yard touchdown scamper in the fourth quarter.

Auburn seemed the more likely one for a big day on the ground with highly touted running back Carnell "Cadillac" Williams. A year previous Cadillac had his break-out game against Arkansas, moving him from third to first on the depth chart at the expense of the Razorbacks. Said Arkansas defensive tackle Jermaine Brooks on Williams, "We gave the Cadillac a flat tire" and, "we just got sick and tired of [hearing about Williams]. If you stop him, you stop Auburn."

Kentucky

Arkansas' ground game continued to impress, with 293 yards, 182 of those from freshman Fred Talley. Overall, Arkansas had 515 yards of total offense to UK's 332. Quarterback Matt Jones set career marks with 15 completions and 210 yards. None of this, was enough as Kentucky managed a 29–17 victory.

Kentucky drove the opening kickoff 40 yards and kicker Taylor Begley hit on a 50-yard field goal. Arkansas had their field goal blocked on the ensuing possession, but fullback Mark Pierce later rumbled for a 34-yard score for the Razorbacks. An Arkansas field goal added to the lead to make it 10–3.  Jared Lorenzen threw a touchdown pass right before halftime, but the extra point was blocked by Pervis Osborne of Arkansas. Arkansas held a one-point edge coming out of halftime when the Wildcats came out with a twenty-point scoring flurry. First a Matt Jones interception gave the Wildcats good field position, setting up an Artose Pinner TD run. Then, an 86-yard punt return by Derek Abney gave Kentucky a 22–10 lead, following a missed extra point. Razorback De'Arrius Howard scored from one yard out, but Jared Lorenzen hit Aaron Boone on a screen pass that went 18 yards to paydirt. Arkansas had two red zone opportunities in the fourth quarter, but neither team could dent the scoreboard, and Kentucky won, 29–17.

Ole Miss

Arkansas ran for 257 yards, and Ole Miss QB Eli Manning threw for 414 yards with two touchdowns and two interceptions. The first points of the game came for the Rebels when Matt Jones was called for intentionally grounding in the end zone, which by rule is scored a safety. Ole Miss gained a 2–0 lead, but fumbled near the close of the first quarter, resulting in a Razorback field goal. Lerinezo Robinson for the Hogs then returned a fumbled kickoff eight yards for a touchdown, giving Arkansas a 10–2 lead. Jonathan Nichols of Ole Miss then hit a 48-yard field, but a Jimmy Beasley interception of Eli Manning set up Arkansas for a 34-yard option keep touchdown by Matt Jones, giving an edge to the Hogs, 17–5. Manning then connected with Justin Sawyer, but the two point play was no good. First a field goal, then a touchdown closed out the first half for the Razorbacks, the TD set up by a 55-yard punt return by Decori Birmingham, to the Ole Miss 20.

The Rebels began the second half with 25-yard field goal. A 63-yard run by Fred Talley set up another Razorback touchdown, and Razorback Tom Crowder recovered the kickoff fumbled by Ole Miss in the end zone, to push the score to 41–14. Manning completed a drive with a 20-yard touchdown pass, but with just over ten minutes left, it was too little to late. Each team then added another touchdown before the Razorbacks homecoming game went final, 48–28. The Razorbacks' outstanding ground game was helped out by five Rebels turnovers, which led to 24 Razorback points.

Troy State

The game was dominated by both defenses, despite a lopsided finish. Troy State's ninth-ranked defense held Arkansas under 150 total yards and six first downs. Arkansas shut out their first opponent since blanking Southwest Missouri State 38–0 in 2000. Special teams stepped up for the Hogs, and two blocked punts, one recovered in the end zone, helped out a struggling offense.

South Carolina

Arkansas beat South Carolina at home as the Hogs won their second consecutive game by the count of 23–0. Matt Jones completed 10 of 18 passes for 113 yards and two scores. Defenders Gavin Walls, Eddie Jackson and Lawrence Richardson had interceptions that each lead to Arkansas points. All of these turnovers helped add to Arkansas' turnover margin of plus-1.88 per game.

Louisiana–Lafayette

Arkansas won their fourth straight game and improved to 16–0 in non-conference play under Houston Nutt with this win. Matt Jones lead rushers with a season-high 129 yards, and the Razorbacks out gained the Ragin' Cajuns on the ground 263 yards to 61. The Hog defense had held every opponent out of the end zone for nine quarters until a pass from Eric Rekieta to Fred Stamps late in the second quarter. Future NFL cornerback Charles Tillman recovered a blocked punt in the fourth quarter, which was the first time since 1991 the Hogs allowed a touchdown off a blocked punt.

Mississippi State

Arkansas went to Scott Field to play winless-in-the-SEC Mississippi State. The Razorbacks defense held on a fourth down play which saved the game. The Razorbacks ran for 237 yards, 121 of those from freshman tailback De'Arruis Howard. Fred Talley fell just short of his fourth 100-yard game as he ran for 94 yards. Mississippi State used two quarterbacks, Kevin Fant was 14-of-26 for 115 yards with an interception. Kyle York entered in the third quarter and went 11-of-22 for 174 yards with one interception and two TDs.

Bulldogs kicker Brent Smith scored the first points of the contest, but two Matt Jones touchdown passes put the Hogs up 14–3. Kevin Fant was sacked by Clarke Moore in the end zone to add two more points for Arkansas. David Carlton added a field goal, his fifth consecutive made field goal. Mississippi State added its own field goal, just before fullback Mark Pierce reached the end zone from five yards out. A comeback was engineered by replacement quarterback Kyle York for the Bulldogs, but it fell seven points short, 26–19.

LSU, The Miracle on Markham

Arkansas and LSU played in War Memorial Stadium for the Golden Boot, a gold trophy that resembles the two states of Arkansas and Louisiana, forming a boot. Arkansas clinched the SEC West crown with this win, moving the Razorbacks to 9–3 overall.

With nine seconds left, Quarterback Matt Jones threw a 31-yard touchdown pass to Decori Birmingham, and kicker David Carlton made a long extra point to finish the Tigers off, 21–20. Down 20–14 with 34 seconds remaining, the Razorbacks first play was a 50-yard pass to Richard Smith.  After an incompletion, Jones found Birmingham in the end zone, who outleaped Randall Gay for the catch. As Hog fans poured onto the field, Arkansas was then penalized 15 yards for excessive celebration, moving the go-ahead extra point to the 35-yard line. Carlton's kick was long enough, but curved left and just snuck in the goal post for a 21–20 lead. Houston Nutt later said that when he was sharing with Jones the plays to run Jones simply said, despite completing only two passes up to that point, "I've got it."

The finish was similar to the Bluegrass Miracle, which involved the same LSU Tigers winning on a last-second 75-yard Hail Mary pass to Devery Henderson to beat the Kentucky Wildcats.

Georgia, SEC Championship

Arkansas represented the Western Division of the SEC in the SEC Championship game in 2002. Arkansas was down 17–0 to Georgia before they gained one yard in the contest, giving the conference title to the Bulldogs. With the loss, Arkansas had only scored six points in two SEC title game appearances, while in contrast, Razorback opponents have scored 64 points against them. Arkansas would make a much better showing their next time in Atlanta, but fail to win again in the 2006 SEC Championship Game against the Florida Gators.

Arkansas got off on the wrong foot as punter Richie Butler's punt was blocked, setting up a one-yard touchdown run for Georgia running back Musa Smith. Another run by Smith pushed the Bulldog advantage to 14–0. Three Georgia field goals added to the score to make it 23–0. Arkansas had only one scoring drive, but even that was on life support, kept alive by two personal fouls, one after an incompletion on 3rd and 23. Georgia added a touchdown, won the game 30–3, and with the victory won the Southeastern Conference.

Coach Houston Nutt said after the game, "I felt like they were playing with 12 men, they have few weaknesses."

Minnesota, Music City Bowl

Minnesota kicker Dan Nystrom made five field goals as the Golden Gophers upset Arkansas in the Music City Bowl. Nystrom was named the MVP, a rarity for a kicker. Nystrom could have had a sixth attempt, but Minnesota instead went for a first down on a fourth and five and was denied with 2:46 remaining in the game.

Arkansas, the best rushing team in the SEC, had only eighty yards on the ground. This was well below their average of 226.9 yards per game. A halftime pass caught by Smith in the end zone would have given Arkansas a halftime lead, but Smith was declared out of bounds, and the score was nullified. The Razorback defense, ranked 40th best in the nation, bent but did not break. The Gophers were stopped and had to settle for field goals three times inside the Arkansas 7.

Coaching staff

Roster

Statistics
Arkansas native Matt Jones was the signal caller for the Razorbacks in 2002. Jones also played basketball on the Razorback basketball team. Jones currently holds the SEC record for most rushing yards by a quarterback, but with the advent of the Spread offense in college football, and new dynamic players in the SEC, his record is in danger of being broken.

Awards and honors

All SEC Teams
 Fred Talley (RB, Sr.) 1st Team All-SEC Offense (Coaches'), 2nd Team All-SEC Offense (AP)
 Shawn Andrews (OT, So.) 1st Team All-SEC Offense, Jacobs Blocking Trophy
 Ken Hamlin (FS, Jr.) 1st Team All-SEC Defense
 Ahmad Carroll (CB, So.) 2nd Team All-SEC Defense
 Tony Bua (OLB, Jr.) 2nd Team All-SEC Defense

Source: 2002 SEC Football Awards

All-Americans

Offense
 Shawn Andrews (OT, So.) AP/Coaches 1st Team

Defense
 Ahmad Carroll (CB, So.) Coaches 2nd Team
 Ken Hamlin (FS, Jr.) AP/Coaches 1st Team
 Tony Bua (LB/FS, Jr.) AP/Coaches 2nd Team

References
 Scores: Howell, James. "Arkansas Historical Scores." January 8, 2008. 2002 Scores. Retrieved on February 20, 2008.
 "Boise State 14, Arkansas 41." Boise State at Arkansas Game Summary. ESPN. Retrieved on February 20, 2008.
 "South Florida 3, Arkansas 42." USF at Arkansas Game Summary. ESPN. Retrieved on February 20, 2008.
 "Alabama 30, Arkansas 12." Alabama at Arkansas Game Summary. ESPN. Retrieved on February 20, 2008.
 "Tennessee 41, Arkansas 38, 6 OT." Arkansas at Tennessee Game Summary. ESPN. Retrieved on February 20, 2008.
 "Arkansas 38, #22 Auburn 17." Arkansas at Auburn Game Summary. ESPN. Retrieved on February 21, 2008.
 "Kentucky 29, Arkansas 17." Kentucky at Arkansas Game Summary. ESPN. Retrieved on February 20, 2008.
 "Mississippi 28, Arkansas 48." Ole Miss at Arkansas Game Summary. ESPN. Retrieved on February 22, 2008.
 "Troy 0, Arkansas 23." Troy at Arkansas Game Summary. ESPN. Retrieved on February 22, 2008.
 "Arkansas 23, South Carolina 0." Arkansas at South Carolina Game Summary. ESPN. Retrieved on February 22, 2008.
 "Louisiana–Lafayette 17, Arkansas 24." Troy at Arkansas Game Summary. ESPN. Retrieved on February 22, 2008.
 "Arkansas 26, Mississippi State 19." Arkansas at Mississippi State Game Summary. ESPN. Retrieved on February 22, 2008.
 "#25 LSU 20, Arkansas 21." LSU at Arkansas Game Summary. ESPN. Retrieved on February 23, 2008.
 "Miracle on Markham." YouTube. Watch the Miracle on Markham Retrieved on February 23, 2008.
 "#25 LSU 20, Arkansas 21." LSU at Arkansas Game Summary. ESPN. Retrieved on February 23, 2008.
 "Georgia 30, Arkansas 3." SEC Championship Game Summary. ESPN. Retrieved on February 25, 2008.
 "Arkansas 14, Minnesota 29." Music City Bowl Summary. ESPN. Retrieved on February 25, 2008.

Arkansas
Arkansas Razorbacks football seasons
Arkansas Razorbacks football